David Crane (born August 13, 1957) is an American writer and producer. He is best known as one of the co-creators of the television sitcoms Friends and Episodes.

Early life 
Crane was born to a Jewish family in West New York, New Jersey, the son of Joan Crane and veteran Philadelphia television personality Gene Crane. He attended Harriton High School in Pennsylvania  and graduated from there in 1975. He is a 1979 graduate of Brandeis University.

Career
He and his husband, Jeffrey Klarik (creator of Half & Half, co-producer Mad About You), created the 2006 ensemble sitcom The Class.

In 2011, Crane and Klarik created a sitcom called Episodes for the BBC. Airing first in the US on Showtime on Sunday January 9, 2011 and then on BBC Two on Monday January 10, 2011, it features Friends star Matt LeBlanc and Green Wing's Stephen Mangan and Tamsin Greig.

Filmography

Television

References

External links
 
 

1957 births
Television producers from Pennsylvania
American television writers
American male television writers
Brandeis University alumni
Gay Jews
American gay writers
Living people
Television personalities from Philadelphia
Showrunners
LGBT television producers
LGBT people from Pennsylvania
People from West New York, New Jersey
Harriton High School alumni
Jewish American screenwriters
Television producers from New Jersey
Jewish American television producers